Running with the Demon is a fantasy novel by American writer Terry Brooks, the first book in the Word & Void fantasy series. It was first published in 1997 by Ballantine's Del Rey division.  The story takes place in a fictional town named Hopewell, Illinois, but is actually based on the author's hometown of Sterling, Illinois around the Fourth of July in 1997.  It is followed by the novel A Knight of the Word.

Plot summary

Nest Freemark is a fourteen-year-old girl of Hopewell, Illinois, who has inherited magical powers from her mother's lineage.  She lives with her grandmother Evelyn and grandfather Bob, as her mother apparently committed suicide at a young age.  She is one of a rare few in the world who can see the spiritual warfare underlying the events in the real world.  She can see "feeders" - small shadowy creatures that feed on human emotion, influence thoughts, and ultimately attempt to "devour" people, causing their real world demise.  Nest is enlisted to guard the nearby park and wilderness, a regional feeding ground for feeders, as many generations of Freemark women before her.  She is aided in this task by a six-inch tree-like sylvan named Pick, an insightful barn owl named Daniel, and an ethereal wolfen creature named Wraith, who appears at opportune moments to protect Nest, but whose origins are initially unknown.

On July first, Nest is awakened by Pick and informed that a young local girl, Bennett Scott, has run away from home (and her mother's abusive boyfriend) into the park and is at risk of being attacked by feeders.  She rescues the girl and is almost overrun by feeders when Wraith appears to fend them off and help her escape. Meanwhile, a demon of the Void has come to the town of Hopewell.  Once a human, this demon now possesses magical powers including the ability to blend in easily among other people and influence their thoughts.  He befriends Derry Howe, a less intelligent resident of Hopewell, and places in his mind the idea of setting a bomb during the fireworks display on the Fourth of July.  Since the display is sponsored by the company that owns the factory, Derry is fooled into believing that the company will have to end a town-crippling strike in apology for the injuries at the show.

The following morning, Nest meets up with her friends, including Bennett's older brother Jared, on whom she has a crush.  They run into a teen bully named Danny Abbot, and Nest uses magic to knock him to the ground to protect her friends.  Later that day, an alarmed Pick leads Nest deep into the park forest and shows her a great oak tree with crevasses in its trunk.  The tree is actually a prison for a maentwrog - a powerful magic beast known for devouring multitudes of people.  The demon has weakened the tree and the maentwrog is threatening to break free, but Nest and Pick do a patch job to strengthen the tree's integrity.

At dinner, Nest is introduced by her grandfather to a traveler named John Ross, who has recently come to town.   He claims to have known Nest's mother, but his true purpose for being in Hopewell is to track and defeat the demon.  John is a "Knight of the Word", charged with helping preserve the balance between the Word (the representation of goodness and light in the world) and the Void (the summation of evil and darkness).  After his post-graduate work, John traveled to Wales and happened upon a glade called Fairy Glen in the country around Betws-y-Coed.  He is met by the Lady (the voice of the Word) and learns that he is the descendant of Owain Glyndŵr, a great Welsh "patriot and warrior" who served the Word.  John was then charged by the Lady  to embrace the Word and fight against the Void whenever he is called on.  After returning to America, he is visited by a Native American named O'olish Amaneh, who reminds him of his oath and hands him a rune-engraved staff of great magic.  Upon taking the staff, John's leg is crippled as a reminder that he is dependent upon the staff, and through it, the Word.

John fights the Void in both the present, and an apocalyptic future where demons are beginning to enslave humanity.  When John sleeps, he has unavoidable dreams in which he experiences his life in this horrific time.   In these visions he finds clues concerning his new mission, as well as the consequences if he should fail.  During these visions, he is a skilled warrior of magic, free of his limp, fighting valiantly to free slaves and thwart the demons.  However, if John uses his magic in the present, he finds himself without that magic for the duration of his next dream.  He is reduced to a vulnerable fugitive who has to scurry and hide to avoid the demon armies.  John has found through his dreams that the demon is Nest's father, and if John does not stop him, Nest will be converted to serving the Void and will be a great leader of the demons in the future.

That evening, Nest sneaks out after dark to meet with O'olish Amaneh, whom she fatefully ran into earlier that day.   O'olish Amaneh is the last of the Sinnissippi tribe that used to live in the area, and invites her to dance with the spirits of the Sinnissippi.  At midnight, he summons the spirits of his tribe and dance among them.  Nest sees a vision of her grandmother as a young lady, running with feeders and interacting with the demon.  O'olish leaves Hopewell that night contemplating his own visions, while Nest struggles with the meaning of hers.

The next day, July 3, John attends church with the Freemark family when they find the feeders crawling all over, invisible to the congregation,  but Wraith appears and scares them off.  The feeders have never entered the church before, and Nest realizes that the demon must be nearby.  The demon confronts her in a wing of the church, threatens her, and demonstrates his power by killing a church member.  That night, the demon influences Danny Abbot to tie up Nest and leave her in a cave.  The demon comes to Nest and taunts her, telling her he can do anything he wants to and she is powerless.  While the demon is away, Nest is rescued by her friends and grandfather.  In addition, while John Ross is spending a romantic evening with his new love interest Josie, the local cafe owner, the demon influences a group of townspeople to attack him.  John is incapacitated and forced to use magic to escape.   While everyone is otherwise engaged, the demon confronts Nest's grandmother, Evelyn, at the Freemark house and is surprised to find that she no longer has magic of her own.  She assaults him in futility with a shotgun, and he kills her.  However, anticipating her death, Evelyn had left Nest a secret note telling her to trust in her magic and in Wraith.

Finally, on July 4, Jared Scott is beaten by his mother's boyfriend and slips into a coma.  The feeders, however, drive the boyfriend into a craze and he ends up accidentally killing himself.  Pick is captured by the demon, and Nest and John confront him at the site of the maentwrog tree.  While Nest's grandfather stops Derry Howe from injuring anyone at the fireworks show, the demon manages to release the maentwrog.  Through extensive magic use, John is able to defeat the creature, but passes out.  The demon confronts Nest alone and teaches her of her past.  She learns that her grandmother once became friends with the demon and would "run with him" instead of fighting against him. At this time, she thought him simply another person, not a demon. The demon tried to seduce her grandmother, but she resisted, and turned to the side of the Word.  In revenge, the demon seduced her daughter, Nest's mother, and she bore him a daughter, Nest.  When Nest's mother found out after Nest was born that he was a demon, she apparently lost her mind and committed suicide.  Now the demon is back for Nest, and by touching her, he can convince her to join the Void.  Wraith appears, but the demon reveals that Wraith is actually a gift from the demon, sent to protect Nest until he could come back and claim her.  Nest holds the demon at bay for a time, but when he is about to lay his hand on her, Wraith turns on the demon and tears him to pieces.  Nest learns from Pick that even though Wraith was created by the demon, her grandmother long ago expended all of her magic to convince Wraith to defend Nest against the demon as well.

The next day, Nest and her grandfather decide to be foster parents for Bennett Scott, as the kids have been legally removed from their home situation.  Nest visits the hospital and uses her magic to bring Jared out of his coma, while John Ross leaves Hopewell on a bus, knowing his life cannot afford him the luxury of staying with Josie.  He falls asleep, anticipating a new mission from the Word.

Characters
The characters in the book are:
 Freemark, Nest
 Ross, John
 O'olish Amaneh
 The demon (unnamed)
 Wraith
 Pick
 Daniel
 Freemark, Evelyn
 Freemark, Robert
 Feeders
 Maentwrog
 Scott, Bennett
 Scott, Jared
 Heppler, Robert
 Freemark, Caitlin 
 Jackson, Josie
 Howe, Derry
 Elway, Junior
 Scott, Enid
 Paulsen, George
 Abbot, Danny

Dates
There are a number of discrepancies with dates in Brooks' novel. Dates given in Terry Brooks' subsequent novel Armageddon's Children confirm that Running with the Demon takes place in 1997.  However, like the other books in the Word/Void trilogy, the days of the week mentioned in the novel do not fall on the given calendar dates.

Another date discrepancy is associated with the character Derry Howe, described as a veteran of the Vietnam War, serving two tours of duty.  A news article gives his age as 38 years old.  The story takes place in 1997, indicating that Derry would have been 16 years old at the time the Vietnam War ended in 1975. However, it also says he is "on the downside of forty."

A third chronological error is given when Nest is said to be training for the Olympics to be held in Melbourne, Australia. The Melbourne Olympics were held in 1956.

References

External links
Terry Brooks official site

1997 American novels
1997 fantasy novels
American fantasy novels
Contemporary fantasy novels
Low fantasy novels
Novels set in Illinois
Marshall County, Illinois
Del Rey books